The Marine Museum of Manitoba, at Selkirk, Manitoba, was established in 1972 to gather ships, artifacts, and items relating to shipping, to tell the story of the development and the operation of transportation on Lake Winnipeg and the Red River. The period covered by the Museum's displays starts circa 1850 and continues to present day.

The Marine Museum is a non-profit organization operated by a board of local citizens operating under the name of The Marine Museum of Manitoba (Selkirk) Inc. With support from the City of Selkirk and nearby businesses, as well as from both the provincial and federal government, the museum’s purpose is to collect, preserve, research, exhibit and interpret its collection of historical artifacts.

The Motor Ship Keenora, built in 1897, is the oldest preserved steamboat in Manitoba.  It was the first acquired by the museum. Abandoned in the Selkirk Slough in 1966, the MS Keenora was purchased from Marine Transport Navigation Company in 1972, by a group of twenty Selkirk businessmen. In the summer of 1973 the Keenora was removed from the waters of the Red River on the Selkirk dry dock (marine railway), then dragged on its keel, across the grass of Selkirk Park, to its present location, near the park entrance. The Keenora opened to the public on weekends beginning October 20, 1973.

Ships
The museum has at least six stationary vessel exhibits:

Affiliations
The Museum is affiliated with: Canadian Museums Association, Canadian Heritage Information Network, and Virtual Museum of Canada.

See also
List of museum ships

References

External links

History museums in Manitoba
Maritime museums in Manitoba
Selkirk, Manitoba
1972 establishments in Manitoba
Museums established in 1972